Zuyaqui (died 2000s) was a Mexican dog who, according to SEDENA, was the dog who found the most drugs in Mexican military and police history.

Zuyaqui was a German Shepherd dog. He gained fame as his exploits became known on international media.

After Zuyaqui's death, his body was dissected and is preserved at the Museo del Enervante, where it is positioned as if he was watching drug dealers' confiscated belongings.

Between 2000 and 2010, Mexican police trained 1,800 dogs to perform jobs similar to Zuyaqui's.

See also
Heena - Indian police dog
Mick the Miller - Irish-British race dog who is displayed at museum
Frida - Mexican human rescuing dog
List of individual dogs

External references

Date of birth unknown
Date of death unknown
Individual dogs
Mexican culture
Illegal drug trade in Mexico
German shepherds
Police dogs